Robert Zammit is an Australian veterinarian and television personality.

Career
He practices in Sydney and was a featured veterinarian on the long-running TV show Burke's Backyard.  He currently hosts a weekly radio show on 2GB. Zammit initially worked as a consultant veterinary surgeon on A Country Practice then began on-screen work with Channel Seven on Terry Willese Tonight. He later appeared as veterinarian on the Today Show then worked with Kerri-Anne Kennerley on the Midday Show.
While still maintaining a veterinary practice on the outskirts of Sydney, his interest in zoo work has seen his family rear some unusual pets including lion cubs, tigers and a puma.

Zammit is an ambassador for the Animal Welfare League of NSW, as well as the director of Zambi Wildlife Retreat alongside Traci Griffiths and Donna Wilson.

References

Australian veterinarians
Male veterinarians
Living people
Year of birth missing (living people)